Petr Švancara (born 5 November 1977) is a former Czech football player.

Švancara started his football career in his native Brno, eventually playing for the local side 1. FC Brno, and, later, for several other Gambrinus liga clubs. In 2008, his goal for FK Viktoria Žižkov in a match against Bohemians Prague was voted  Gambrinus liga goal of the year.

In June 2012, Švancara, the captain of Brno, signed a two-year extension to his contract to keep him at the club until 2014.

References

External links
 
 
 Profile at FC Zbrojovka Brno website
 Profile at 1. FC Slovácko website

1977 births
Living people
Czech footballers
Czech Republic under-21 international footballers
Czech First League players
FC Zbrojovka Brno players
1. FC Slovácko players
SK Slavia Prague players
FK Viktoria Žižkov players
SFC Opava players
FK Inter Bratislava players
1. FK Příbram players
Slovak Super Liga players
Expatriate footballers in Slovakia
Footballers from Brno
Association football forwards